Henry Kirk Greer (October 11, 1899 – July 20, 1978) was an American field hockey player who competed in the 1932 Summer Olympics.

In 1932 he was a member of the American field hockey team, which won the bronze medal. He played two matches as halfback.

He was born in North Adams, Massachusetts and died in Dennis, Massachusetts.  He graduated from Williams College and Harvard Law School.

External links
 
profile

1899 births
1978 deaths
American male field hockey players
Field hockey players at the 1932 Summer Olympics
Olympic bronze medalists for the United States in field hockey
People from North Adams, Massachusetts
Williams College alumni
Medalists at the 1932 Summer Olympics
Harvard Law School alumni
Sportspeople from Berkshire County, Massachusetts